Pol Sangi ( "Stone Bridge") is a bridge in Tabriz, Iran, over the Quri River. The stone bridge belongs to the Qajar period and is located in Chaiknar, in front of the Pol Sangi (Stone Bridge) Mosque. The bridge was registered as a national monument of Iran on August 1, 2005 with the registration number 12438.

References 
 http://www.eachto.ir

External links 
 Virtual Museum of Historical Buildings of Tabriz (School of Architecture, Tabriz Islamic Art University).
 Tabriz Islamic Art University (دانشگاه هنر اسلامی تبریز), Tabriz, Iran (in Persian). 
 Iranian Student's Tourism & Traveling Agency, ISTTA. (English), (Persian)

Buildings and structures in Tabriz
Architecture in Iran
Bridges in Iran
Persian words and phrases
Transportation in East Azerbaijan Province
National works of Iran